Dímun is a village in Stóra Dímun, Faroe Islands.

Populated places in the Faroe Islands